Syneta was a town of ancient Caria, inhabited during Hellenistic times. Its name does not occur among ancient authors, but is inferred from epigraphic and other evidence.

Its site is tentatively located near Bucakköy in Asiatic Turkey.

References

Populated places in ancient Caria
Former populated places in Turkey
History of Aydın Province